Aurel may refer to:

Places 
 Aurel, Drôme, France
 Aurel, Vaucluse, France

Other uses 
 Aurel (given name)
 Aurel Awards, a Slovak music award
 AuRel, a dragon in E. E. Knight's Age of Fire series